As of March 2022, AnadoluJet operates flights to domestic destinations and international destinations in several countries across Europe and Asia.

Destinations

References

External links

Lists of airline destinations